Miroslav "Miro" Major is a New Zealand footballer and futsal player, who is currently playing for Metro F.C. in the Lotto Sport Italia NRFL Premier. He is a member of the New Zealand national futsal team, which is nicknamed the Futsal Whites.

Born to Croatian parents, his father Mišo played professionally in Croatia.

Career
Major had a successful spell with Central United in 2004, before joining Mangere United during the same year. He made his first appearance in the ASB Premiership with YoungHeart Manawatu in the 2005-2006 NZFC season, before transferring to Auckland City late in 2006-07 NZFC season.

International career
Major made his debut for the New Zealand national futsal team in 2009.

Club history
 Central United  (2004)
 Mangere United (2004–2006)
 YoungHeart Manawatu (2006–2007)
 Auckland City FC (2007–2008)
 Auckland City FC (2010–present)
 Futsal Whites - New Zealand National Futsal Team (2009–present)

References

External links
NZ Football
 Metro F.C.
Young Heart Manuatu
Auckland City FC
NZ football player profile

 Miro Major led the way.

New Zealand association footballers
New Zealand people of Croatian descent
Auckland City FC players
1980 births
Living people
Association football midfielders